Before the Acts of Union 1707, the barons of the sheriffdom or shire of Ayr elected commissioners to represent them in the Parliament of Scotland and in the Convention of the Estates. The number of commissioners was increased from two to four in 1690.

After the Union, Ayrshire returned one Member of Parliament to the House of Commons of Great Britain and later to the House of Commons of the United Kingdom.

List of shire commissioners
 1605, 1609: Sir John Wallace of Carnell

Sources
 Return of Members of Parliament (1878), Part II.
 Joseph Foster, Members of Parliament, Scotland (1882). 
 George Edward Cokayne, The Complete Baronetage, 5 vols (1901–6).
 The Records of the Parliaments of Scotland.

See also
 List of constituencies in the Parliament of Scotland at the time of the Union

References

Constituencies disestablished in 1707
Constituencies of the Parliament of Scotland (to 1707)
1707 disestablishments in Scotland
Politics of Ayrshire